Kateřina Pivoňková (born May 6, 1979 in Vlašim, Středočeský) is a retired female backstroke swimmer from the Czech Republic, who twice competed for her native country at the Olympic Games: in 1996 and 2004.

References
 

1979 births
Living people
Czech female swimmers
Female backstroke swimmers
Swimmers at the 1996 Summer Olympics
Swimmers at the 2004 Summer Olympics
Olympic swimmers of the Czech Republic
People from Vlašim
Sportspeople from the Central Bohemian Region